Conasprella armiger is a species of sea snail, a marine gastropod mollusk in the family Conidae, the cone snails and their allies.

Like all species within the genus Conasprella, these snails are predatory and venomous. They are capable of "stinging" humans, therefore live ones should be handled carefully or not at all.

Distribution
This species occurs in the Caribbean Sea, the Gulf of Mexico and off the Lesser Antilles.

Description 
The maximum recorded shell length is 40 mm.

Habitat 
Minimum recorded depth is 35 m. Maximum recorded depth is 227 m.

References

 Rehder, H. A. & Abbott, R. T. 1951. J. Wash. Acad. Sci. 41 (1): 22, figure 1–6.
 Clench, W. J. and Pulley, T. E. 1952. Notes on some marine shells from the Gulf of Mexico with a description of a new species of Conus. Texas Journal of Science 1:59-58, 1 pl.
 Puillandre N., Duda T.F., Meyer C., Olivera B.M. & Bouchet P. (2015). One, four or 100 genera? A new classification of the cone snails. Journal of Molluscan Studies. 81: 1–23

External links
 Crosse H. (1858). Observations sur le genre Cone et description de trois espèces nouvelles, avec un catalogue alphabétique des Cônes actuellement connus. Revue et Magasin de Zoologie. ser. 2, 10: 113–127, pl. 2 [March 1858], 150–157 [April 1858], 199–209
 Kiener, L.C. (1844–1850). Spécies général et iconographie des coquilles vivantes. Vol. 2. Famille des Enroulées. Genre Cone (Conus, Lam.), pp. 1–379, pl. 1-111 [pp. 1–48 (1846); 49–160 (1847); 161–192 (1848); 193–240 (1849); 241-[379](assumed to be 1850); plates 4,6 (1844); 2–3, 5, 7–32, 34–36, 38, 40–50 (1845); 33, 37, 39, 51–52, 54–56, 57–68, 74–77 (1846); 1, 69–73, 78–103 (1847); 104–106 (1848); 107 (1849); 108–111 (1850)]. Paris, Rousseau & J.B. Baillière
 The Conus Biodiversity website
 

armiger
Gastropods described in 1858